East St. Clair Township is a township in Bedford County, Pennsylvania, United States. The population was 2,897 at the 2020 census.

History
The Osterburg Covered Bridge and Snooks Covered Bridge were listed on the National Register of Historic Places in 1980.

Geography
The township is located in northwestern Bedford County. It is bordered to the north by King Township, to the northeast by South Woodbury Township, to the east by Bedford Township, to the southwest by Napier Township, to the west by West St. Clair Township, and at its northernmost point by Lincoln Township. It surrounds but does not include the borough of St. Clairsville.

Demographics

As of the census of 2000, there were 3,123 people, 1,198 households, and 894 families residing in the township.  The population density was 92.3 people per square mile (35.6/km2).  There were 1,406 housing units at an average density of 41.5/sq mi (16.0/km2).  The racial makeup of the township was 98.43% White, 0.51% African American, 0.03% Native American, 0.67% Asian, 0.10% from other races, and 0.26% from two or more races. Hispanic or Latino of any race were 0.42% of the population.

There were 1,198 households, out of which 35.5% had children under the age of 18 living with them, 61.6% were married couples living together, 9.2% had a female householder with no husband present, and 25.3% were non-families. 22.0% of all households were made up of individuals, and 8.3% had someone living alone who was 65 years of age or older.  The average household size was 2.61 and the average family size was 3.04.

In the township the population was spread out, with 26.0% under the age of 18, 8.1% from 18 to 24, 30.8% from 25 to 44, 22.4% from 45 to 64, and 12.6% who were 65 years of age or older.  The median age was 36 years. For every 100 females there were 102.0 males.  For every 100 females age 18 and over, there were 98.3 males.

The median income for a household in the township was $34,847, and the median income for a family was $38,429. Males had a median income of $28,776 versus $20,170 for females. The per capita income for the township was $16,211.  About 6.6% of families and 8.4% of the population were below the poverty line, including 9.4% of those under age 18 and 9.0% of those age 65 or over.

References

Populated places established in 1794
Townships in Bedford County, Pennsylvania
1794 establishments in Pennsylvania